Adrián Misael Martínez (born December 10, 1996) is a Mexican professional baseball pitcher for the Oakland Athletics of Major League Baseball (MLB). He made his MLB debut in 2022.

Career

San Diego Padres
Martínez signed with the San Diego Padres as an international free agent in February 2015. He spent the 2015 season with the Dominican Summer League Padres, recording a 4.41 ERA with 19 strikeouts over  innings. He missed the 2016 after undergoing Tommy John surgery. He returned in 2017 with the Arizona League Padres, going 2–3 with a 4.50 ERA and 37 strikeouts over 30 innings. He split the 2018 season between the Fort Wayne TinCaps of the Class A Midwest League and the Tri-City Dust Devils of the Class A Short Season Northwest League, combining to go 4–6 with a 6.90 ERA and 78 strikeouts over  innings. He split the 2019 season between Fort Wayne and the Lake Elsinore Storm of the Class A-Advanced California League, going a combined 7–4 with a 3.22 ERA and 76 strikeouts over 81 innings. Martínez did not play in 2020, with the cancelation of the minor league season due to the COVID 19 pandemic. He opened the 2021 season with the San Antonio Missions of the Double-A Central, going 7–3 with a 2.34 ERA and 83 strikeouts over  innings. He was then promoted to the El Paso Chihuahuas of the Triple-A West league. Over 9 games for El Paso, Martínez went 1–2 with a 5.28 ERA and 39 strikeouts over  innings.

On November 7, 2021, Martínez was selected to San Diego's 40-man roster.

Oakland Athletics
On April 3, 2022, the Padres traded Martínez, along with Euribiel Angeles, to the Oakland Athletics for Sean Manaea. He opened the 2022 season with the Las Vegas Aviators. On May 10, he was promoted to the active roster to make his MLB debut. He made his MLB debut that day, earning his first career victory with 5.1 shutout innings against the Detroit Tigers.

Martínez was optioned to Triple-A Las Vegas to begin the 2023 season.

References

External links

1996 births
Living people
Sportspeople from Mexicali
Mexican expatriate baseball players in the United States
Major League Baseball players from Mexico
Major League Baseball pitchers
Oakland Athletics players
Dominican Summer League Padres players
Arizona League Padres players
Tri-City Dust Devils players
Fort Wayne TinCaps players
Águilas de Mexicali players
Lake Elsinore Storm players
San Antonio Missions players
El Paso Chihuahuas players
Las Vegas Aviators players
2023 World Baseball Classic players